Dr. Leonard Kapiloff (March 1, 1915 – November 25, 1993), of Maryland, was a philatelist recognized for his collecting of United States postage stamps issued prior to 1900.

Collecting interests
Dr. Kapiloff was noted for his collecting of 19th century postage stamps and postal history of the United States. He was able, during his lifetime, to create two award-winning collections, United States Postage Issues from 1847 to 1857, which won the gold at  ISRAPHIL ’85 and at other exhibitions, and his second significant collection which centered on New York Postmaster Provisionals and the United States and City Despatch Posts.

Philatelic activity
From 1986 to 1988, Dr. Kapiloff was a trustee at the Philatelic Foundation.

Honors and awards
Kapiloff was awarded the Mortimer Neinken medal in 1992 by the Philatelic Foundation for his services to the hobby of philately. In 1994, Kapiloff was named to the American Philatelic Society Hall of Fame.

See also
 Stamp collecting

References

1915 births
1993 deaths
Philatelic literature
American philatelists
People from Maryland
American Philatelic Society